Tangshan railway station is a station in Lubei District, Tangshan, Hebei, China. It is located on the Tianjin–Shanhaiguan railway, Tianjin–Qinhuangdao high-speed railway and the under construction Beijing–Tangshan intercity railway.

History 
Construction of Tangshan railway station started on 17 March 1993, and opened to passenger services on 11 November 1994. The original Tangshan railway station was renamed Tangshan South.

On 26 November 2013, a new station building was put into use.

See also 
 Tangshan South railway station
 Tangshan West railway station (station on Beijing-Tangshan intercity railway, U/C)

References 

Railway stations in Hebei
Railway stations in China opened in 1994
Stations on the Tianjin–Qinhuangdao High-Speed Railway